Israel Land Development Company (ILDC) (Hachsharat HaYishuv) is one of Israel's largest conglomerates, with fields including real estate, construction, energy and hotels. It was acquired in 1987 by Yaakov Nimrodi.

History
ILDC was founded in 1909 by the Zionist Federation as the Palestine Land Development Company, or Palestine Land Development Corporation. It was a program of the practicalist movement in early Zionism, particularly in the decade before the start of World War I. The PLDC worked to purchasing land, to train Jews in agricultural pursuits, and to establish Jewish agricultural settlements in Palestine. By the outbreak of World War I it had purchased about 50,000 dunam (about 4600 hectares) of land.  It was attempting to purchase nearly 3 times that amount in the Jezreel Valley, however the outbreak of the war prevented it from making such a purchase.

It became an Israeli public company in 1953.

Yaakov Nimrodi took control of the company in 1988 with a $26m investment. In 2006 Nimrodi signed an agreement to buy out a 20% minority shareholder which valued the company at $172m.

Properties owned by ILDC
 Rimonim Hotels

References

External links
Official website 
Map of Haifa by the Palestine Land Development Company, ca.1926. Eran Laor Cartographic Collection, The National Library of Israel.

Conglomerate companies established in 1909
Companies formerly listed on the Nasdaq
Companies listed on the Tel Aviv Stock Exchange
Real estate companies of Israel
Zionist organizations
Real estate companies established in 1909
1909 establishments in the Ottoman Empire